SMM may refer to:

Religion
 Company of Mary, a Roman Catholic missionary religious congregation
 Church of St. Mary Magdalene (Toronto), a church in Toronto, Canada

Science
 Science Museum of Minnesota
 Single-molecule magnet
 S-Methylmethionine, a derivative of methionine
 Soft Magnetic Materials Conference
 Solar Maximum Mission or SolarMax, an artificial satellite
 Stepwise mutation model, of allelic frequencies

Medicine
 Smouldering Multiple Myeloma

Technology
 Scattering-matrix method, to solve Maxwell's equations
 Storage Modification Machine, a type of Pointer machine in computing
 System Management Mode, of a x86 CPU
 Maxwell (microarchitecture), a GPU microarchitecture
 Super Mario Maker, 2015 video game
 Social media marketing

Other 
 Master of Sacred Music
 Musasa language, ISO 639-3 code
 Semporna Airport, IATA code
 Sex Money Murda, a street gang in America
 Shanghai Metals Market, China
 Single monthly mortality, for prepayment of loan
 ORG, Known ORG Player
 OSCE Special Monitoring Mission to Ukraine